Langsa (Indonesian: Kota Langsa,), is a city in Aceh, Indonesia. It is located on the island of Sumatra. Apart from a small sea coast to the northeast, it borders Manyak Payed District of Aceh Tamiang Regency to the east and is otherise surrounded by Birem Bayeun District of Aceh Timur Regency (of which the city was formerly a part until 2001) to the north, west and south. The city covers an area of 239.83 square kilometres and had a population of 148,945 at the 2010 Census (compared with 117,256 at the previous 2000 Census); this grew to 185,971 at the 2020 Census.

Langsa is located 440 kilometres (273 miles) from the city of Banda Aceh, the province's capital. Langsa is close to its province's southern border and is 167 kilometres (103 miles) from Medan, the capital city of North Sumatra. This makes Langsa a strategic city for trade and traffic between the two provinces.

There are several universities in the city of Langsa both state and private universities. Among them are Samudra University and IAIN Zawiyah Cot Kala, Campus LP3I. The city hosts several schools of nursing and midwifery, including the Academy of Nursing of "Harapan Ibu", the Academy of Nursing "Yayasan Cut Nyak Dhien" and the Academy of Nursing "UMMI".

History

Darul Islam Rebellion
On 21 September 1953, Darul Islam forces invaded Langsa. They attacked Military Police and Mobile Brigade barracks. TNI repelled DI/TII attack after receiving reinforcement troops from Medan.

Administrative districts 
The city is divided into five districts (kecamatan), tabulated below with areas and their population at the 2010 and 2020 Censuses. The table also includes the number of administrative villages (urban kelurahan and rural desa) in each district.

Climate 
Langsa has a tropical rainforest climate (Af) with moderate rainfall from February to April and heavy rainfall in the remaining months.

Population 

Langsa's population is mainly made up of people of Acehnese, Malay, Javanese, Chinese, and Batak ethnicities. Acehnese is the main language used by people who consider themselves as of Acehnese ethnicity, but the Indonesian language is the official language.

Islam is the religion of the majority in Aceh, including Langsa, but other religions exist, such as Christianity and Buddhism. Buddhism is common among Langsa's ethnically Chinese population.

Although Langsa is a city of rich ethnic and religious diversity, its population tends to be tolerant of each other's differences.

People from Langsa 
 Jessica Mila
 Kivlan Zen
 Jusman Syafii Djamal
 Johannes Antonius Franciscus Roelen
 Peter Kuiper
 Jalwandi Jamal

References

External links 

 Kota Langsa Official Website
 
 >> Instagram Photos Tags Kota Langsa

Populated places in Aceh
Cities in Aceh